School of Architecture and Design may refer to:

School of Architecture and Design, King Mongkut's University of Technology Thonburi
Oslo School of Architecture and Design
RMIT School of Architecture and Design